A MOB, short for man overboard boat, is a small, fast rescue boat which large vessels, especially passenger ferries and cruise ships, use for man overboard situations. MOBs use diesel or gasoline-powered engines and are constructed of highly buoyant materials making them nearly unsinkable.

Design
MOBs are constructed from fire-retardant polyester fibreglass resin. Due to the inherent buoyancy of the materials, the vessel is nearly unsinkable. Each boat seats five people with room for a sixth lying down on the floor. The MOB is usually davit-launched.

Regulations
According to International Maritime Organization regulations, passenger ships that are less than  require one Rescue boat and those that are larger need to carry at least one rescue boat on each side of the ship. Cargo ships need to carry one rescue boat.

Citations

External links
 Fast rescue craft

English inventions
Lifeboats
Ship's boats